Gamaleya may refer to:

People
 Boris Gamaleya (1930–2019), Réunion poet, literary critic, linguist, folklorist, and social activist
 Nikolay Gamaleya (1859–1949), Russian and Soviet microbiologist and vaccine researcher
 Platon Yakovlevich Gamaleya (1766–1817), Russian Empire naval officer and navigator

Places
 Gamaleya Rock, rock formation in Antarctica named after Platon Yakovlevich Gamaleya

Organisations
 Gamaleya Research Institute of Epidemiology and Microbiology, named after Nikolay Gamaleya